Your Hand In Mine (Chinese: 想握你的手) was a long-running TV drama produced by Singapore's free-to-air channel, MediaCorp TV Channel 8. With 180 episodes, it was the longest local drama produced by Mediacorp, until it was succeeded by 118. It aired on weekdays at 7:00 pm. The series' cast included are Huang Wenyong, Chen Liping, Yvonne Lim, Pierre Png, Belinda Lee, Shaun Chen, Paige Chua, Joanne Peh, Pan Lingling and Cavin Soh.

Episode list (Episodes 1 to 90)

Episode list (Episodes 91 to 180)

References

Lists of Singaporean television series episodes